Domnall Mór Ua Cellaigh, 42nd King of Uí Maine and 9th Chief of the Name, died 1221.

Reign

Domnall Mór's reign is one of the most obscure of the High Medieval kings of Uí Maine. The kingdom is only indirectly mentioned in the annals. While the Ua Conchobair succession dispute regularly devastated Connacht and the Anglo-Irish began raids and settlement west of the Shannon. In 1189 Conchobar meanmaige Ua Conchobair was slain by a unknown culprit.

Descendants

Domnall Mór is notable for the claim, noted by John O'Donovan as recorded in a Trinity College Dublin pedigree of the Mac Eochadha (Keogh) family, that he was the common ancestor of all the extant branches of the Uí Cellaigh Uí Maine. This may simply mean that, while other lines had lost lands and status and became peasants, most of his bloodline continued to exist among the gentry after the collapse of Gaelic Ireland. 

It further states that he was the ancestor of all subsequent kings and chiefs, bar four.

Domnall Mór married Dubh Cobhlaigh Ní Briain, a daughter of King Domnall Mór of Thomond (died 1194).

Children of Domnall Mór and Dubh Cobhlaigh included:

 - Eoghan, the third son, became ancestor of the Clann Maince Eoghain, who gave their name to the barony of Clanmacnowen, and whose chiefs were semi-independent vassals of the senior Ua Cellaigh.
 - Diarmaid, their youngest son, became ancestor of the Mac Eochadha (Keogh) family of Maigh Finn (now Taughmaconnell). This surname is still found in County Roscommon and County Galway.

References

 The Tribes and customs of Hy-Many, John O'Donovan, 1843
 The Surnames of Ireland, Edward MacLysaght, Dublin, 1978.
 Annals of Ulster at CELT: Corpus of Electronic Texts at University College Cork
 Annals of Tigernach at CELT: Corpus of Electronic Texts at University College Cork
Revised edition of McCarthy's synchronisms at Trinity College Dublin.

People from County Galway
People from County Roscommon
Kings of Uí Maine
 Domnall Mor